Shantilal Shah Engineering College
 is approved by and affiliated to the Gujarat Technological University. It is accredited by All India Council for Technical Education, New Delhi and Government of Gujarat. The institute started functioning from the academic year 1983-84.

Academics
Research activities are carried out in the areas of Technology.

Branches
 Information Technology
 Electronics And Communication
 Electrical
 Instrumentation And Control
 Civil
 Mechanical
 Production

References

External links
 Shantilal Shah Engineering College Gallery, Sidsar Campus, Bhavnagar

Education in Bhavnagar
Engineering colleges in Gujarat